Bandaranayake College Gampaha (Sinhala: බණ්ඩාරනායක විද්‍යාලය ගම්පහ) is a leading Buddhist Boys' school in 
Gampaha, Sri Lanka, founded on 18 September 1918. Boys are admitted at grade six, based on the results of an island-wide Scholarship Examination.

History

In 1918, this school was established as Henarathgoda Seewali Buddhist School at the place where Yasodara Devi Balika Maha Vidyalaya is presently located. Charles Samarasooriya was the first principal of the school. In 1949, the school was established as the Henarathgoda Senior Secondary School, and then it was established as the Henarathgoda Secondary English School at its present location. When the school was established at its current location, Jinadasa Munasinghe was the principal.

In 1923, this school was promoted as a First Grade School. It had been a mixed school up to 1985. On 25 May 1993, the school was advanced to the National Level as, Bandaranayake Vidyalaya.

Houses 
The students are divided into four houses:

These houses are named after some of the greatest ancient kings in the history of Sri Lanka. Students participate in an annual inter-house sport meet.

Media

Notable alumni

References

External links 

 Official Website

1918 establishments in Ceylon
Boarding schools in Sri Lanka
Boys' schools in Sri Lanka
National schools in Sri Lanka
Schools in Gampaha